Jaime García Morey (16 June 1942 – 7 July 2015) better known as Jaime Morey was a Spanish singer from Alicante, best known for representing Spain in the Eurovision Song Contest 1972 in Edinburgh with the song "Amanece". He finished 10th in a field of 18.

References

Sources
Official website

1942 births
2015 deaths
People from Alicante
Singers from the Valencian Community
Eurovision Song Contest entrants for Spain
Eurovision Song Contest entrants of 1972
Place of death missing
20th-century Spanish musicians
20th-century Spanish male singers
20th-century Spanish singers